Dún na Rí Forest Park is a forest park is situated on the County Cavan-County Monaghan border, in Ireland. The park itself borders the Shercock and Carrickmacross roads more specifically at Magheracloone and Kingscourt. The park forms a part of the old Cabra Estate.

History
This land was owned by the O'Reilly family until the end of the sixteenth century when it came into the ownership of Thomas Fleming. He built a castle on the site, the ruins of which can still be seen. The estate then passed to the Pratt family, forming part of the Cabra Estate; Mervyn Pratt founded Kingscourt in 1760-1770, the modern name being an anglicisation of Dunaree. In 1959, the land was acquired by the Irish Forest Service, and became a forest park in the 1970s.

Wildlife
Situated in a tranquil glen, Dún na Rí is home to stoats, hares, mink, rabbits and otters, as well as red and grey squirrel along the banks of the River Cabra. The larger trees are mainly oak and ash but many other species are also present, with an under storey of hazel, holly and rhododendron. The ground is carpeted with bluebells in spring, and there are snowdrops, wood anemone, woodrush, foxgloves, wood sorrel and many species of fern.

Amenities
It is a peaceful place with a lake, walled garden, open air sculptures and many attractions. There are several marked trails. There is a small parking fee, a car park, a picnic area and toilets.

References

Protected areas of County Cavan
Protected areas of County Monaghan
Parks in County Cavan
Parks in County Monaghan